Polina Vladislavovna Agafonova (born 2 April 1996 in Severodvinsk) is a Russian former competitive figure skater. She is the 2010 World Junior bronze medalist and 2010 Russian national junior champion.

Career 
During the 2009–10 season, Agafonova debuted on the Junior Grand Prix (JGP) series. She won a bronze medal in Germany and placed sixth in Poland. She won gold at the Russian Junior Nationals and was sent to compete at the Junior Worlds, Agafonova won the bronze medal at the event.

During the 2010–11 season, Agafonova won no JGP medals in her events and dropped to 7th at Russian Junior Nationals. She was not sent to Junior Worlds.

In the 2011–12 season, Agafonova was assigned to Junior Grand Prix events in Latvia and Austria and won a pair of bronze medals. Agafonova then competed on the senior level at the 2011 Coupe de Nice and won the gold medal. She finished 4th at the 2012 Russian Junior Championships.

Programs

Competitive highlights

Detailed results

References

External links 

 

1996 births
Living people
People from Severodvinsk
Russian female single skaters
World Junior Figure Skating Championships medalists
Sportspeople from Arkhangelsk Oblast